East Lombok Regency is a regency of the Indonesian Province of West Nusa Tenggara. It is located on the island of Lombok, of which it comprises the eastern third (including minor offshore islands); the administrative capital is the town of Selong. The Regency covers an area of 1,605.55 km2 and had a population of 1,105,582 at the 2010 Census and 1,325,240 at the 2020 Census; the official estimate as at mid 2021 was 1,343,901.

Location 
To the north lies the Java Sea.  To the west is Central Lombok Regency.  To the south is the Lombok Basin and the Indian Ocean and to the east lies Elas Strait, a narrow body of water separating Lombok and the nearby small Gili Belang from Sumbawa which lies approximately 15 km to the east.
The north of the Regency is on the eastern flank of Mount Rinjani which at 3,726 m is the third highest mountain the second largest volcano in the country.  The mountain is an active volcano, the oldest recorded historical eruption was in 1847 and last eruption was in May 2010.

Administration 
The area of East Lombok Regency is 2,679.88 km², consisting of a landmass area of 1,605.55 km ² (59.91%) and a seabed area of 1,074.33 km² (40.09%).

Administrative structure 
Kabupaten Lombok Timur (East Lombok Regency) is one of Lombok's four Regencies or administrative regions.

 TGH M Zainul Majdi, MA., Governor of NTB (West Nusa Tenggara), (Mataram is the Provincial Capital of West Nusa Tenggara)
 Drs. HM Sukiman AZMY, MM, Regent (Bupati) of Kabupaten Lombok Timur (East Lombok Regency).

Administrative boundaries

Administrative Districts 
At the 2010 Census, the East Lombok Regency consisted of twenty districts (kecamatan), but an additional district (Lenek) was added in 2018 by splitting off 10 villages in the western part of Aikmel District. The districts are tabulated below with their areas and their populations at the 2010 Census and the 2020 Census, together with the official estimates as at mid 2021. The table also includes the locations of the district administrative centres, the number of administrative villages (rural desa and urban kelurahan) in each district, and its postal codes.

Notes: (a) including 4 small islands off the east coast of Lombok Island. (b) includes 24 islands off the southeast corner of Lombok Island. (c) the 2010 Census population of the new Lenek District is included in the figures for Aikmel District, from which it was subsequently split off in 2018. (d)includes 7 islands off the northeast corner of Lombok Island.

The districts are subdivided into 239 rural Desa and 15 urban Kelurahan; of the latter 11 are in Selong District and 4 are in Labuhan Haji District.

Population 
The majority of the population are Sasak people. In 2008 East Lombok Regency recorded a total of 1,068,486 residents: 494,149 males and 574,337 females.

In the 2010 Census, East Lombok Regency recorded 1,105,582 inhabitants, 24.7% being officially below Indonesian poverty level; the 2020 Census showed the population having risen to 1,325,240.  The population of this regency are primarily Muslim.

Ethnicity 
The Sasak people are the indigenous people of Lombok and form the majority of East Lombok's residents, with few people of Balinese origin compared with West Lombok. East Lombok is also home to people of Balinese, Chinese, Tionghoa-peranakan people of mixed Indonesian and Chinese descent and small number of Arab Indonesian people, mainly of Yemeni descent who originally settled in the early port city of Ampenan.

Religion 
Islam is the religion of the majority of the population of East Lombok. Other religions practised in East Lombok are Christianity, Catholicism, Hinduism, Buddhism, and Confucianism.

Language 
Most people in east Lombok normally speak the Sasak language. Sasak is the native language of the indigenous people of Lombok. Indonesian is the language most widely used in everyday interactions at places such as hotels, larger shops in the township of Praya and in government offices. When at home or a place of recreation east Lombok residents tend to use local eastern Lombok dialects of the Sasak language.

Land use 
Rivers and catchment areas:Lombok Island has four main watersheds. Menanga watershed, which is administratively in the territory of East Lombok, has been declared by the Governor of Nusa Teggara Barat to be a critical watershed by Decree No. 122 in 2005. Lombok is faced with a serious water supply and management problem, caused by increasing forest and water table damage, land degradation and poor forestry management. West Nusa Tenggara province as a whole is threatened with a water crisis caused by increasing forest and water table damage and degradation.

 Services and development 
The region is essentially agrarian in activity with rice, copra, casava, tobacco, timber and other crops. Rainfall is lower in the south of the Regency and higher in the north as the land rises toward Mount Rinjani. Rinjani supplies a rainfall catchment area to the region and several into eastern Lombok rivers flow from its slopes. The sea supports a small local fishing industry, seaweed harvesting, a pearl industry and prawn farming.

The growing tourism industry in Lombok has had little effect on the eastern coast.
The proximity of the new Lombok International Airport will possible lead to an increase in tourism related business and development in east Lombok in coming years.

 Transport Public ferries' provide services for both passengers and vehicles. Labuhan Lombok is in East Lombok Regency and provides connections eastward to Sumbawa.  Tanjung Lembar in the south west of the island is Lombok's main port and handles small freighters, fishing boats and the combination vehicle and passenger ferries heading westward to Bali.Alat Strait:  Labuhan Lombok - Pototano, Sumbawa with 8 ferries providing 18 crossings per day.Lombok Strait:  Lembar Lombok - Padang Bai, Bali, with 12 ferries providing crossings once every hour.
These ferries connecting to nearby Sumbawa and Bali provide the principal facilities for road transport movements in and out of Lombok. Disruptions on these routes can significantly affect trade and the provision of supplies to the island as the shipping operators on these routes will often suspend services due to breakdown or heavy seas.

East Lombok is served by the Lombok International Airport''' (Bandara Internasional Lombok'') .
The new airport provides domestic terminal facilities serving destinations in Java, Bali and Sumbawa. The main terminal building also provides international terminal facilities, currently limited to international connections to Malaysia provided by AirAsia. International flights to Kuala Lumpur provided by Garuda and Merpati airlines depart from the Domestic terminal.

The new international airport will provide facilities for wide bodied aircraft with more modern terminal facilities and improved cargo facilities.

Lombok International Airport in Central Lombok is south west of Praya in south central Lombok. The airport commenced operations on 1 October 2011 replacing the previous international and domestic facilities at Selaparang Airport near Ampenan in West Lombok Regency which formally closed for operations on the evening of 30 September 2011. All services previously operated at the Selaparang airport were moved across to the new airport at that time.

References

External  links 

 
 Kabupaten Lombok Utara the Regency of North Lombok
 Kabupaten Lombok Tengah, the Regency of Central Lombok
 Kabupaten Lombok Timur, the Regency of East Lombok
 Kabupaten Lombok Barat, the Regency of West Lombok
 Nusa Teggara Barat, West Nusa Teggara
 Kota Mataram, City of Mataram

Regencies of West Nusa Tenggara